The 2009–10 Western Athletic Conference men's basketball season began with practices on October 17, 2009 and ended with the 2010 WAC men's basketball tournament March 11–13, 2010 at the Lawlor Events Center in Reno, NV on the campus of the University of Nevada. Utah State won the regular season championship while New Mexico State won the WAC Tournament.

Pre-season
The WAC conducted a media teleconference on October 20, 2009 and released the media and coaches poll, as well as the preseason All-WAC teams and player of the year.

WAC Media Poll

Media All-WAC Team
 Luke Babbitt, So. F, Nevada
 Mac Hobson, Sr. G, Idaho
 Armon Johnson, Jr. G, Nevada
 Jared Quayle, Sr. G, Utah State
 Jahmar Young, Jr. G, New Mexico State
Player of the Year
 Luke Babbitt, So. F, Nevada

WAC coaches poll

Coaches All-WAC Team
First Team
 Luke Babbitt, So. F, Nevada
 Mac Hobson, Sr. G, Idaho
 Armon Johnson, Jr. G, Nevada
 Jered Quayle, Sr. G, Utah State
 Jahmar Young, Jr. G, New Mexico State
Second Team
 Roderick Flemings, Sr., F, Hawai‘i
 Paul George, So. G/F, Fresno State
 Kyle Gibson, Sr. G, Louisiana Tech
 Sylvester Seay, Sr. F, Fresno State
 Tai Wesley, Jr. F, Utah State
Player of the Year
 Luke Babbitt, So. F, Nevada

Rankings

Conference games

Players of the week
Players of the week:

On January 26 San Jose State's Adrian Oliver was named the Oscar Robertson National Player of the Week by the U.S. Basketball Writers Association for games ending the week of January 24.

Conference tournament

Head coaches

Greg Graham, Boise State (fired on March 12, 2010)
Steve Cleveland, Fresno State
Bob Nash, Hawai'i (fired on March 8, 2010)
Don Verlin, Idaho
Kerry Rupp, Louisiana Tech

David Carter, Nevada
Marvin Menzies, New Mexico State
George Nessman, San Jose State
Stew Morrill, Utah State

Post season

NCAA tournament
First round

(12) New Mexico State vs. (5) Michigan State L 70–67

(12) Utah State vs. (5) Texas A&M L 69–53

NIT
First round

(6) Nevada @ (3) Wichita State W 74–70

Second round

(6) Nevada @ (2) Rhode Island L 85–83

CollegeInsider.com tournament
First round

Louisiana Tech vs. Southern Mississippi W 66–57

Quarterfinals

Louisiana Tech @ Missouri State L 69–40

2010 NBA draft

Pre-draft trades
Prior to the day of the draft, the following trades were made and resulted in exchanges of draft picks between the teams.

 On June 25, 2009, Minnesota acquired Charlotte's first-round pick from Denver in exchange for the draft rights to Ty Lawson. Previously, Denver acquired a first-round pick on June 25, 2008 from Charlotte in exchange for the 20th pick in the 2008 draft.
 On June 23, 2010, Oklahoma City acquired Daequan Cook and the 18th pick in the 2010 Draft from Miami in exchange for the 32nd pick in the 2010 Draft. Previously, Oklahoma City acquired Etan Thomas and two second-round picks on July 27, 2009 from Minnesota in exchange for Damien Wilkins and Chucky Atkins. Previously, Minnesota acquired a second-round pick and cash considerations on June 25, 2009 from Dallas in exchange for the draft rights to Nick Calathes. Previously, Dallas acquired a second-round pick, the 24th and 56th picks in the 2009 draft on June 24, 2009 from Portland in exchange for the 22nd pick in the 2009 draft.
 On June 22, 2010, Milwaukee acquired Corey Maggette and the 44th pick in the 2010 draft from Golden State in exchange for Charlie Bell and Dan Gadzuric. Previously, Golden State acquired the 44th pick in the 2010 draft and cash considerations on June 21, 2010 from Portland in exchange for the 34th pick in the 2010 draft. Previously, Portland acquired 2009 and 2010 second-round picks from Chicago in a three-team trade on June 26, 2008.

Draft-day trades
The following trades involving drafted players were made on the day of the draft.

 Portland acquired Ryan Gomes and the draft rights to 16th pick Luke Babbitt from Minnesota in exchange for Martell Webster.
 Indiana acquired the draft rights to 51st pick Magnum Rolle from Oklahoma City in exchange for the draft rights to 57th pick Ryan Reid.

Highlights and notes

Awards and honors

All-Americans

All WAC teams

First team
Luke Babbitt, Nevada
Jahmar Young, New Mexico State
Adrian Oliver, San Jose State
Jared Quayle, Utah State
Tai Wesley, Utah State

Second team
Paul George, Fresno State
Kyle Gibson, Louisiana Tech
Magnum Rolle, Louisiana Tech
Armon Johnson, Nevada
Jonathan Gibson, New Mexico State

Honorable mention
Daequon Montreal, Boise State
Sylvester Seay, Fresno State
Roderick Flemings, Hawai'i
Mac Hopson, Idaho
Wendell McKines, New Mexico State

All–defensive team
Marvin Jefferson, Idaho
Kyle Gibson, Louisiana Tech
Magnum Rolle, Louisiana Tech
Dario Hunt, Nevada
Pooh Williams, Utah State

All–newcomer team
Daequon Montreal, Boise State
Greg Smith, Fresno State
DeAndre Brown, Louisiana Tech
Nate Bendall, Utah State
Brian Green, Utah State

Player of the year
Luke Babbitt, Nevada
Freshman of the year
Greg Smith, Fresno State
Don Haskins coach of the year
Stew Morrill, Utah State

All-Academic

USBWA All-District team

References